Marsha G. Cheeks (born March 7, 1956) is a Detroit-born politician from the U.S. state of Michigan. She is a Democrat and member of the Michigan House of Representatives. She represents the 6th State House District, which includes most of Downtown Detroit. She is also the aunt of former Detroit mayor and convicted criminal Kwame Kilpatrick and sister of United States Representative Carolyn Cheeks Kilpatrick.

References

Living people
1956 births
Democratic Party members of the Michigan House of Representatives
Politicians from Detroit
Women state legislators in Michigan
African-American women in politics
African-American state legislators in Michigan
20th-century African-American women
20th-century African-American people
21st-century American women politicians
21st-century American politicians
21st-century African-American women
21st-century African-American politicians